Islander's Castle is a residence of Governor Glenda Ecleo, of Dinagat Islands. Although not open to the public, the home can be viewed from the gates. The building, also known as the "White Castle", was erected by Glenda Ecleo, widow of Ruben Ecleo, in 2007, reportedly cost P350 million (approximately US$  million) to build, and has been noted as overlooking a vista of shanties and unfinished roads.

References

History of Dinagat Islands
Culture of Dinagat Islands
Landmarks in the Philippines